Raffles Hotels & Resorts is a chain of luxury hotels which traces its roots to 1887 with the opening of the original Raffles Hotel in Singapore. The company started to develop internationally in the late 1990s. Since 2015, Raffles is part of Accor.

History 
Raffles Hotels & Resorts was formed in 1989 to restore, redevelop and manage the historic Raffles Hotel in Singapore. The corporation also undertook the restructuring and management of the Raffles City development, thus laying the foundation for Raffles Hotels & Resorts to become a hotel management company. After a complete restoration, the Raffles Hotel reopened on 16 September 1991.

In April 2001, Raffles Holdings acquired Swissôtel from SAirGroup for 268 million euros, thus increasing its room capacity by 139% to 13,500 units in 17 countries.

In 2005, Colony Capital bought Raffles Holdings for $1 billion from the Singapore government. Raffles and Swissôtel joined Fairmont Hotels in the newly formed holding, FRHI Hotels & Resorts, in 2006.

In December 2015, Accor announced the acquisition of FRHI Hotels & Resorts, taking over the Fairmont, Raffles, and Swissotel hotel chains. The $2.7 billion deal was finalized in July 2016.

Current properties 
Raffles Hotels & Resorts operates at 17 locations worldwide.

Future properties 
Raffles Hotels & Resorts develops the following locations worldwide.

After Indian Hinduja Group and Spanish Obrascón Huarte Lain bought the War Office in London, they decided to transform the administrative building into a hotel and signed a deal with Accor in June 2017 to add it to the Raffles portfolio of luxury hotels. The 125-room Raffles London at The OWO is scheduled to be completed in early 2022 with Philippe Leboeuf as managing director.

In June 2019, Accor announced that it will be opening a second Raffles hotel in Singapore in 2022. To be located in Sentosa, the Raffles Sentosa Resort & Spa Singapore will feature 61 villas.

In July 2019, Accor announced that it will be opening a Raffles Resort in Bahrain in 2022 after its acquisition of Al Areen Palace & Spa. The Raffles Manama, Bahrain will feature 78 luxury villas and the world's first garden hammam and a spa hydrothermal garden.

In December 2020, Accor announced that it will be opening a new hotel in Moscow, next to the Kremlin, in the second half of 2022. The 153-room hotel will be named Raffles Moscow.

In February 2021, Accor announced that it will be opening a dual-branded Fairmont and Raffles hotel named Fairmont and Raffles Lusail Hotel and Residences in Qatar in 2022. It will house 361 rooms and suites under the Fairmont brand, and 132 suites under the Raffles brand.

In March 2021, Accor announced that it will be opening a new hotel in Galaxy Macau, in Cotai. Named Raffles at Galaxy Macau, it will open in 2022.

Scheduled to be completed in 2022, Raffles Jeddah, situated in Saudi Arabia, will house 181 rooms.

Scheduled to be completed in 2022, the 33-storey Raffles Boston Back Bay Hotel & Residences, located in Back Bay, Boston, will feature 147 rooms and suites.

Other products

Raffles Residences 
Raffles Residences is a collection of private residential suites and apartments that are serviced by Raffles Hotels & Resorts and are usually connected to a Raffles-branded hotel. There are currently three Raffles Residences with more scheduled to be completed in the next few years.

Raffles 1915 Gin 
In 2015, to commemorate the 100th anniversary of the Singapore Sling, Raffles Hotels & Resorts partnered with London-based microdistillery Sipsmith to create a brand-made gin, the Raffles 1915 Gin.

Soirées, Sojourns & Stories by Raffles 
Released in 2018, Soirées, Sojourns & Stories by Raffles is a book highlighting the history and some of the iconic guests of Raffles Hotels & Resorts.

References

External links 
 Official website

 
Hotels established in 1989
Hospitality companies of Singapore
Hotel chains in Singapore
Accor